Collateral Man, originally titled El garante, is an Argentine television horror miniseries originally transmitted in 1997 by Canal 9.

Created and directed by Sebastián Borensztein, it stars Lito Cruz and Leonardo Sbaraglia.

Synopsis 
The story is about the relationship established between Martin Mondragon, a young psychologist (Sbaraglia) and the man who seeks to collect a debt left by his grandfather a long time ago. The psychologist's grandfather had signed a pact with the devil, but died without delivering his soul. As set out on the contract, Mondragon's grandfather agrees to offer his (then unborn) grandson's soul as the guarantor of the deal. José Sagasti (Lito Cruz), Satan's agent, presents himself to Mondragon as the one in charge of collecting the old debt and informing the guarantor of his fate. Being a psychologist, Mondragon thinks to have run into a psychopath and dismisses his threats. But soon after their first meeting, Sagasti starts playing mind games and making Mondragon's life a living hell.

Through its eight chapters, this mini-series recounts the struggle of Martin to avoid surrendering his soul to Sagasti, the envoy of the devil. Both characters give life to a confrontation that is waged on the earthly plane, and at the same time the one-upmanship also plays on the psychologies of both men.

Cast 
 Lito Cruz ... Jose Sagasti
 Leonardo Sbaraglia ... Martin Mondragon
 Eleonora Wexler ... Abril, Martin's girlfriend
 David Masajnik ... Marcelo, a friend of Martin
 Luis Luque ... Eduardo, Martin's psychiatrist friend
 Luis Ziembrowski ... Gonzalez
 Franklin Caicedo ... Lozada
 Jorge Marrale ... Satan

Awards

Martín Fierro Awards 
Martin Fierro 1997:
 TV Miniseries:
 The Guarantor - Nominated
 Dramatic Actor Role:
 Lito Cruz - Nominated
 Leonardo Sbaraglia  - Winner
 Author and/or Screenwriter:
 Sebastián Borensztein, Marcelo and Walter Slavich - Winner
 Director:
 Sebastián Borensztein  - Winner
 Integral Production/Best Production:
 The Guarantor - Winner
 Soundtrack/Original Soundtrack:
 The Guarantor, by  Alejandro Lerner - Nominated

FUNDTV Awards 
 Fiction:
 The Guarantor - Winner

Emmy nomination 
The show was also nominated for the Emmy Awards.

Legacy 
Collateral Man marked a turning point in television fiction in Argentina, as it was meant to recover the prestige of the horror genre; it was popular with the audiences, and in 1997 the miniseries won several Martin Fierro Awards and was nominated for several international awards. Since then, it has been broadcast via on-air channels and cable several times, always being a success.

References

External links

1997 Argentine television series debuts
1990s Argentine television series